Henry "Jun" Dueñas Jr. (born November 19, 1965) is a Filipino politician who was a member of the Philippine House of Representatives representing 2nd district of Taguig from 2007 to his replacement by Angelito Reyes in 2010. He was also a Vice Chairman of Public Order and Safety.

Councilor of Taguig
Prior to his elections in the Congress, Dueñas served as a councilor for the second district of Taguig from 2001 to 2007.

House of Representatives
When the Lone district of Taguig was divided into 2 separate districts, he ran for the second congressional District of Taguig and was allied with Taguig Mayor Sigfrido Tiñga. On the 2007 midterm elections, Dueñas won the congress seat for Taguig but he and Angelito "Jett" P. Reyes, son of then-Energy Secretary Angelo Reyes, were rival candidates for the position of congressman in the 2nd legislative district of Taguig in the May 14, 2007 synchronized national and local elections. After the canvass of the votes, Duenas was proclaimed the winner, having garnered 28,564 votes as opposed to private respondent’s 27,107 votes. Not conceding defeat, Reyes filed an election protest, praying for a revision/recount, alleging that he was cheated in the protested 170 of 732 precincts through insidious and well-orchestrated electoral frauds and anomalies which resulted in the systematic reduction of his votes and the corresponding increase in petitioner’s votes. Dueñas has been replaced by Reyes on February 28, 2010.

As a member of the House of Representatives, Dueñas proposed and authored the following bills:
 House Bill No. 2425, creating three branches of Metropolitan Trial Court of Metro Manila for Taguig.
 House Bill No. 4994, creating seven branches of Regional Trial Court for Taguig.
 House Bill No. 5854, creating three additional branches of Metropolitan Trial Court of the NCR to be stationed at Taguig.
 House Bill No. 6406, excluding certain parcels of land of the public domain in Western Bicutan.
 House Bill No. 6445, creating seven branches of the Regional Trial Court for Taguig.

Dueñas (Lakas Kampi CMD) and Reyes (Lingkod Taguig) were slated to face rivalry again in the 2010 election as the former withdrew from the race to support outgoing Mayor Tiñga's candidacy for the same position.

Comeback attempts
Dueñas attempted a comeback to the Congress by running for the second district of Taguig in the 2013 local elections but eventually lost to Lino Cayetano.

Dueñas then ran for vice mayor of Taguig in the 2019 local elections as the running mate of outgoing Pateros–Taguig Congressman Arnel Cerafica, who is running for mayor under PDP–Laban. However, they both lost.

References

External links

Living people
1965 births
Lakas–CMD (1991) politicians
Kilusang Diwa ng Taguig politicians
Lakas–CMD politicians
Liberal Party (Philippines) politicians
Nationalist People's Coalition politicians
PDP–Laban politicians
Members of the House of Representatives of the Philippines from Taguig
Metro Manila city and municipal councilors
People from Taguig